Abdullah Doshi (born 28 October 1993) is a football player who plays as a midfielder for Hetten.

External links 
 

Living people
Association football midfielders
Saudi Arabian footballers
1993 births
Hetten FC players
Al-Fateh SC players
Al-Watani Club players
Al-Qala Club players
People from Jizan Province
Saudi First Division League players
Saudi Professional League players
Saudi Second Division players
Saudi Fourth Division players